Samaanta is a 1972 Bollywood drama film directed by Nitin Bose.

Cast
Ashoo   
Dheeraj Kumar   
Snehlata

External links
 

1972 films
1970s Hindi-language films
1972 drama films